Koulikoro (Bambara: ߞߎߟߌߞߏߙߏ tr. Kulikoro) is a town and urban commune in Mali.

Koulikoro is the terminus of the Dakar-Niger Railway which was completed in 1904. Between August and November, at the end of the rainy season, goods are transported down the Niger River to Ségou, Mopti, Tombouctou and Gao. Navigation is not possible upstream of Koulikoro because of the Sotuba Rapids near Bamako.

Koulikoro is also the location of a prison. The Koulikoro prison is noteworthy for housing a number of former Rwandan officers found guilty of having taken part in the Rwandan genocide.

Gallery

Sister cities
 Bous, Germany
 Quétigny, France

References

External links
.

 
Communes of Koulikoro Region
Regional capitals in Mali
Communities on the Niger River